Arminas Kazlauskis (born 4 May 1989) is a Lithuanian male BMX rider, representing his nation at international competitions. He competed in the time trial event at the 2015 UCI BMX World Championships.

References

External links
 
 

1989 births
Living people
BMX riders
Lithuanian male cyclists
European Games competitors for Lithuania
Cyclists at the 2015 European Games
Place of birth missing (living people)